Stefan Matteau (born February 23, 1994) is an American professional ice hockey forward for ERC Ingolstadt of the Deutsche Eishockey Liga (DEL). Matteau was born in Chicago, Illinois, but grew up in Blainville, Quebec.

Playing career
Matteau was drafted 29th overall in the 2012 NHL Draft by the New Jersey Devils. He is described as a rugged power forward who plays a hard-nose style. Matteau debuted for the Devils on January 19, 2013, against the New York Islanders.

Matteau signed an entry-level contract with the Devils on August 14, 2012. He played in his sixth NHL game on February 7, 2013, against the Tampa Bay Lightning, making his contract take effect.

Matteau recorded both his first career NHL point and goal at 16:31 into the second period on February 9, 2013, against Marc-André Fleury of the Pittsburgh Penguins at the Prudential Center.

During the 2015–16 season, having been unable to attain a regular forward role, Matteau was traded by the Devils to the Montreal Canadiens in exchange for Devante Smith-Pelly on February 29, 2016.

On July 1, 2017, Matteau as a free agent signed a one-year, two-way deal the Vegas Golden Knights.

After two seasons within the Golden Knights organization, Matteau left Vegas as a free agent. On August 22, 2019, Matteau was signed to a one-year AHL contract with the Cleveland Monsters, affiliate to the Columbus Blue Jackets. Serving in a leadership role with the Monsters, Matteau registered 12 goals and 28 points through 50 games in the 2019–20 season, before he was signed to a two-year, two-way contract with the Blue Jackets on February 19, 2020, and was immediately recalled to join the Blue Jackets in his return to the NHL. He scored his first NHL goal in more than four years in his first game with the Blue Jackets on February 20, 2020, against the Philadelphia Flyers, the same team he had scored his last NHL goal on December 4, 2015, while a member of the New Jersey Devils.

On July 29, 2021, having left the Blue Jackets organization, Matteau was signed as a free agent to a one-year, two-way contract with the Colorado Avalanche. After attending the 2021 Avalanche training camp, Matteau was originally reassigned to AHL affiliate, the Colorado Eagles. Before making an appearance with the Eagles, Matteau was recalled by the Avalanche and made his debut in the second game of the  season on October 16, 2021, against the St. Louis Blues. During the first-period and featuring on Colorado's fourth-line, Matteau suffered a high ankle sprain which subsequently ruled him out long-term.

Returning to health after four-months on the injured reserve, Matteau was reassigned to the AHL and made his Eagles debut on February 26, 2022. Remaining with the Eagles for the remainder of the campaign, Matteau added a veteran presence and contributed with 10 points through 20 games. He added 3 goals in the playoffs with the Colorado Eagles, before falling in the Pacific Division Finals against the Stockton Heat.

As a free agent at the conclusion of his contract with the Avalanche, Matteau opted to sign his first contract abroad after signing a two-year deal with Swedish club, Linköping HC of the Swedish Hockey League (SHL), on July 29, 2022. In his first European campaign, Matteau was slow to adapt with Linköping HC, registering just 1 assist through 16 games to start the 2022–23 season. After seeking a release from his contract in the SHL, Matteau left to sign for the remainder of the season with German club, ERC Ingolstadt of the DEL, on November 17, 2022.

International play
Matteau represented United States at the 2014 World Junior Ice Hockey Championships.

Personal life
Matteau is the son of former NHL player Stéphane Matteau, who is known for scoring the double overtime game seven goal for the New York Rangers in the Eastern Conference Finals against the New Jersey Devils in the 1994 playoffs. His sister, Alyson Matteau currently plays professionally for the NWHL's Buffalo Beauts, after captaining the University of Maine Black Bears.

Matteau was born in Chicago, when his father was a member of the Chicago Blackhawks, and lived in New York City, St. Louis, Silicon Valley and South Florida during his father's career, before his family settled in the Montreal area.

Career statistics

Regular season and playoffs

International

References

External links

1994 births
Albany Devils players
American men's ice hockey centers
Blainville-Boisbriand Armada players
Canadian ice hockey centres
Chicago Wolves players
Cleveland Monsters players
Colorado Avalanche players
Colorado Eagles players
Columbus Blue Jackets players
ERC Ingolstadt players
Ice hockey people from Chicago
Ice hockey people from Quebec
Linköping HC players
Living people
Montreal Canadiens players
National Hockey League first-round draft picks
New Jersey Devils draft picks
New Jersey Devils players
People from Blainville, Quebec
St. John's IceCaps players
USA Hockey National Team Development Program players
Vegas Golden Knights players